The Minneapolis Guitar Quartet, founded in 1986, is regarded as one of North America's leading guitar ensembles. They have several recordings under the Albany Records label.  Their first two albums were New Works for Guitar Quartet and Over Land and Sea. [citation - Soundboard Magazine]

Current members of the quartet are Maja Radovanlija, Benjamin Kunkel, Wade Oden, and Joseph Hagedorn (a founder). Previous members include, the group's founder - Alan Johnston, O. Nicholas Raths, Juan Fernandez, John Chatterton, Jeff Lambert, Jeffrey Thygeson, David Crittenden, Steven Newbrough, and Ben Gateno.

External links 
 Official MGQ website

Classical guitar ensembles